Dad Stop Embarrassing Me! is an American comedy streaming television series created by Jamie Foxx and Jim Patterson that premiered on Netflix on April 14, 2021. In June 2021, the series was canceled after one season.

Cast and characters

Main

 Jamie Foxx as Brian Dixon, a single father and businessman based in Atlanta. He inherited his mother's cosmetics company known as BAY Cosmetics. 
 Foxx also plays in one-time episode roles: Rev. Sweet Tee, the local church's reverend; Cadillac Calvin, Brian's uncle and Pops' brother; and Rusty, a bartender
 David Alan Grier as Pops Dixon, Brian's father
 Kyla-Drew as Sasha Dixon, Brian's teenaged daughter who recently moved from Chicago to Atlanta after the death of her mother
 Porscha Coleman as Chelsea Dixon, Brian's sister and Pops' daughter
 Jonathan Kite as Johnny Williams, Brian's best friend who is an Atlanta police officer
 Heather Hemmens as Stacy Collins, Brian's colleague at BAY Cosmetics

Recurring

 Valente Rodriguez as Manny, Brian's handyman
 Miracle Reigns as Zia Williams, Sasha's best friend and Johnny's daughter

Guest
 Luenell as Sheila
 Eugene Byrd as Matt Ross
 Jackée Harry as Elizabeth, Pops' sister and Brian's aunt

Episodes

Production

Development
On September 1, 2020, Netflix gave Dad Stop Embarrassing Me! a series order. The series was created by Jamie Foxx and Jim Patterson who also executive produced it alongside Bentley Kyle Evans and Corinne Foxx with Alex Avant serving as a producer. Ken Whittingham directed six of the eight episodes. On June 18, 2021, Netflix canceled the series after one season.

Casting
Upon series order announcement, it was announced that Foxx was cast in a starring role alongside Kyla-Drew, David Alan Grier, Porscha Coleman, Jonathan Kite, and Heather Hemmens while Valente Rodriguez was cast in a recurring role.

Filming
The series was filmed at Sunset Bronson Studios in Hollywood, California, but it is set in Atlanta, Georgia.

Release
The series was released on April 14, 2021.

Reception
The review aggregator website Rotten Tomatoes reported an approval rating of 25% based on 12 critic reviews, with an average rating of 4.98/10. The website's critics consensus reads, "Jamie Foxx is funny – sadly, Dad Stop Embarrassing Me! is not." Metacritic gave the series a weighted average score of 49 out of 100 based on 10 critic reviews, indicating "mixed or average reviews".

References

External links
 
 

2020s American comedy television series
2020s American black sitcoms
2021 American television series debuts
2021 American television series endings
English-language Netflix original programming
Television shows set in Atlanta
Television series about families
Television series about single parent families
Television series created by Jamie Foxx